Big Tings is the seventh studio album from Welsh rock band Skindred. It was released on 27 April 2018.

Track listing

Personnel
Skindred
 Benji Webbe – lead vocals, keyboards
 Daniel Pugsley – bass
 Mikey Demus – guitars, backing vocals
 Arya Goggin – drums

Charts

References

2018 albums
Skindred albums
Napalm Records albums